Karl Anselm Franz Joseph Wilhelm Louis Philippe Gero Maria, 4th Duke von Urach, Count von Württemberg (born 5 February 1955) is the former head of the morganatic Urach branch of the House of Württemberg. He was the third pretender to the defunct Lithuanian throne following the death of his uncle, Karl Gero.

Biography
He was born in Regensburg, West Germany, the son of Prince Eberhard von Urach and Princess Iniga of Thurn and Taxis. He is a grandson of Wilhelm, Duke von Urach, who was from 11 July 1918 to November 1918 the King-elect Mindaugas II of Lithuania. The title "Duke of Urach" was abolished alongside all other noble privileges in Germany in 1919, with hereditary titles thereafter being relegated to surnames.

He became an engineer, having studied agronomy at the University of Kiel. Karl Anselm succeeded his childless uncle Karl Gero as fourth Duke von Urach following his death in 1981. He held the defunct ducal title until 9 February 1991 when he married a commoner and renounced it. His brother Wilhelm Albert succeeded him as head of the Urach branch of the House of Württemberg. 
Karl Anselm lives at Niederaichbach Castle, Bavaria, and is the owner of Greshornish Forestry estate in Inverness, Scotland.

Marriage and issue
He married Saskia Wüsthof (born 1968) on 9 February 1991 at Stuttgart. They had two children before divorcing in 1996.

 Wilhelm Karl Gero Eberhard Peter Maria Prinz von Urach, born 8 July 1991
 Maximilian Emanuel Wolfgang Luitpold Robert Prinz von Urach, born 5 May 1993

He married Uta Maria Priemer (born 1964, whose daughter Teresa von Bülow married Count Ferenc Kornis von Göncz-Ruszka, grandson of Prince Rasso of Bavaria) on 2 September 2014.

Ancestry

References

Property website

  

1955 births
Living people
People from Regensburg
Dukes of Urach
German Roman Catholics
Princes of Urach